The 1968 Sugar Bowl was the 34th edition of the college football bowl game, played at Tulane Stadium in New Orleans, Louisiana, on Monday, January 1. The unranked LSU Tigers of the Southeastern Conference (SEC) rallied to top the undefeated and sixth-ranked Wyoming Cowboys of the Western Athletic Conference (WAC), 20–13.

Entering the bowl season, Wyoming was the only undefeated team in the nation among major schools, but LSU was favored by a touchdown, largely because it had faced a tougher schedule than the Cowboys and virtual home field advantage, as the Tigers were playing just  from their campus.

Teams

Wyoming

LSU

Game summary
The first game of a major bowl tripleheader (Rose, Orange) on NBC, it kicked off at 1 pm CST. Following morning rains, the game was played on soggy natural turf in clammy  temperatures.

After a scoreless first quarter, Wyoming drove eighty yards and scored on a one-yard sweep run from halfback Jim Kiick; Jerry DePoyster added field goals of 24 and 49 yards and the Cowboys led  at halftime.

In the third quarter, LSU running back Glenn Smith came off of the bench and scored on a one-yard touchdown run, making the score  In the fourth quarter, Tiger quarterback Nelson Stokley completed touchdown passes of eight and fourteen yards to end Tommy Morel as LSU rallied for a  The last score occurred with more than four minutes remaining; quarterback  advanced the Cowboys deep into LSU territory, but Wyoming flanker Gene Huey was tackled in-bounds on the five-yard line and 

Smith, a third-string sophomore, entered the game late in the third quarter and was named the game's most valuable player.

Scoring
First quarter
No scoring
Second quarter
Wyo – Jim Kiick 1 run (Jerry DePoyster kick), 14:56
Wyo – DePoyster 24 FG, 2:58
Wyo – DePoyster 49 FG, 0:01
Third quarter
LSU – Glenn Smith 1 run (Roy Hurd kick), 2:10
Fourth quarter
LSU – Tommy Morel 8 pass from Nelson Stokley (Hurd kick), 11:39
LSU – Morel 14 pass from Stokley (Hurd kick), 4:22

Statistics
{| class=wikitable style="text-align:center"
! Statistics !! Wyoming !!  LSU 
|-
|First downs||20||12
|-
|Rushing yards||48–167||48–151
|-
|Passes||14–24–4||6–20–1    
|-
|Passing yards||239||91
|-
|Total offense||72–406||68–242
|-
|Punts–average||4–49.0||9–37.1
|-
|Fumbles lost||1||0
|-
|Turnovers||5||1
|-
|Penalities–yards||5–65||3–25
|}

Aftermath
This was the only victory for the Southeastern Conference (SEC) this bowl season: Ole Miss lost the Sun Bowl, Alabama the Cotton, and Tennessee the Orange.

LSU's next major bowl appearance was three years later in the Orange Bowl. They did not return to the Sugar Bowl until 1985, and their next major bowl win was the 2002 Sugar Bowl.

This remains Wyoming's only New Year's Day bowl appearance.

References

Sugar Bowl
Sugar Bowl
LSU Tigers football bowl games
Wyoming Cowboys football bowl games
Sugar Bowl
Sugar Bowl